The 2012 Poznań Open was a professional tennis tournament played on clay courts. It was the ninth edition of the tournament which was part of the 2012 ATP Challenger Tour. It took place at the Park Tenisowy Olimpia in Poznań, Poland from 14 to 22 July 2012, including the qualifying competition in the first two days.

Singles main draw entrants

Seeds

Other entrants
The following players received wildcards into the singles main draw:
  Piotr Gadomski
  Andriej Kapaś
  Michał Przysiężny
  Maciej Smoła

The following players received entry from the qualifying draw:
  Marcin Gawron
  Grzegorz Panfil
  Patrik Rosenholm
  Michael Ryderstedt

Withdrawals
Before the tournament
  Pedro Sousa

Doubles main draw entrants

Seeds

Other entrants
The following pairs received wildcards into the doubles main draw:
  Igor Bujdo /  Mikołaj Jędruszczak
  Adam Chadaj /  Michał Przysiężny
  Piotr Gadomski /  Maciej Smoła

Champions

Singles

 Jerzy Janowicz def.  Jonathan Dasnières de Veigy, 6–3, 6–3

Doubles

 Rameez Junaid /  Simon Stadler def.  Adam Hubble /  Nima Roshan, 6–3, 6–4

References

External links
Official Website
Player Acceptance List

Poznan Open
Poznań Open
Poz